Jungle Fever is a soundtrack album by American R&B singer-songwriter, producer, and multi-instrumentalist Stevie Wonder, recorded for the film Jungle Fever. It was released by the Motown label on May 28, 1991.

Jungle Fever became Wonder's ninth album, and fifth in a row, to reach No. 1 on the Billboard R&B Albums chart. Three singles were released from the soundtrack: the first and the biggest hit single was "Gotta Have You" (Hot 100 No. 92, R&B No. 3), with the second single "Fun Day" (R&B No. 6, UK No. 63) and the final single "These Three Words" (R&B No. 7).

Critical reception 

Jungle Fever received lukewarm reviews from critics. Reviewing for Entertainment Weekly in 1991, Bill Wyman said the album lacks worthwhile hooks and lyrics, and that Wonder's style of arrangement sounds "more and more dated as the years go by". In a positive review, Rolling Stone magazine called Jungle Fever a "welcome return to form" and said that Wonder has not "sounded so freewheeling, confident and engaging" since his 1980 album Hotter Than July. The Chicago Tribune wrote that it is "as direct and consistently tuneful as anything he has done in recent years". Robert Christgau of The Village Voice cited "Fun Day" and the title track as highlights and referred to Wonder as "a genius even if that's what he's selling".

In a retrospective review for AllMusic, Stephen Thomas Erlewine cited Jungle Fever as "Wonder's best work in years ... a considerable improvement from his bland late-'80s albums", although he said Wonder can be too sentimental on ballads such as "These Three Words". J. D. Considine wrote in The Rolling Stone Album Guide (2004) that it is "lightweight but likeable". In his 2000 Consumer Guide book, Christgau gave the album a three-star honorable mention, which indicated "an enjoyable effort consumers attuned to its overriding aesthetic or individual vision may well treasure".

Track listing
All songs written by Stevie Wonder, except "Chemical Love", lyrics by Stephanie Andrews.

"Fun Day" – 4:41
"Queen in the Black" – 4:46
"These Three Words" – 4:54
"Each Other's Throat" – 4:17
"If She Breaks Your Heart" (sung by Kimberly Brewer) – 5:03
"Gotta Have You" – 6:26
"Make Sure You're Sure" – 3:30
"Jungle Fever" – 4:55
"I Go Sailing" – 3:58
"Chemical Love" – 4:26
"Lighting Up the Candles" – 4:09

Personnel
Credits adapted from album’s liner notes.

Musicians
 Stevie Wonder — lead vocals (all tracks), backing vocals (1, 2, 5, 9-11), backing vocal arrangements (1-6, 8-11), piano (1, 3, 6, 7, 11), drums and percussion (1, 2, 4-6, 8-11), synth bass (2, 4-10), synth guitar (4, 6, 8-10), synth horns (2, 4, 6, 8, 11), electric piano (1, 5, 9), synth strings (2, 5, 10), harmonica (1, 11), synth harp (2, 11), synth organ (4, 6), synth voice (9, 10), bass (1), synth flute (5)
 John Aceuedo — strings (track 7)
 Sikir’u Bimbo Adepoju — additional drums and additional percussion (track 8)
 Robert Becker — strings (track 7)
 Alvino Bennett — drums (tracks 3, 7)
 Kimberly Brewer — lead vocals and backing vocal arrangements (track 5), backing vocals (3-6, 9)
 Boyz II Men — backing vocals (track 8)
 Shirley Brewer — backing vocals (track 9)
 Bridgette Bryant — backing vocals (tracks 3, 4, 6)
 Lenny Castro — additional drums and additional percussion (track 8)
 Larry Corbett — strings (track 7)
 Earl DeRouen — additional drums and additional percussion (track 8)
 Jacquelyn Farris — backing vocals (track 9)
 Lynn Fiddmont-Linsey — backing vocals (tracks 3, 4, 6)
 Nancy Fields — backing vocals (track 8)
 Pamela Gates Henderson — strings (track 7)
 Jon Gibson — backing vocals (track 9)
 Susan Gikaru — backing vocals (track 8)
 Larry Gittens — trumpet (track 5)
 Vaughn Halyard — percussion (track 6)
 Dorian Holley — backing vocals (tracks 1, 2)
 Norman Hughes — strings (track 7)
 Sylvester Irungu — backing vocals (track 8)
 Keith John — backing vocals (tracks 1-4, 6, 9), backing vocal arrangements (8)
 Peter Kent — strings (track 7)

 Amy Keys — backing vocals (track 9)
 Rose Kimani — backing vocals (track 8)
 Faith Kinyua — backing vocals (track 8)
 Linda Kinyua — backing vocals (track 8)
 Winnie Kuria — backing vocals (track 8)
 Maysa Leak — backing vocals (tracks 3, 9)
 Catherine Likimani — backing vocals (track 8)
 Samson Malelu — backing vocals (track 8)
 Nancy K. Masaki-Hathaway — strings (track 7)
 Norah Mbusi — backing vocals (track 8)
 Munyungo — additional drums and additional percussion (track 8)
 Babatunde Olatunji — additional drums and additional percussion (track 8)
 Sid Page — concertmaster and contractor (track 7)
 Kelly Parkinson — strings (track 7)
 Darryl Phinnessee — backing vocals (tracks 3, 4, 6)
 Vladimir Polimatio — strings (track 7)
 Greg Poreé — guitar (track 3), strings and conductor (7)
 Irene Prabhudas — backing vocals (track 8)
 Sekou Rubadiri — backing vocals (track 8)
 Isaiah Sanders — synthesizer (track 3)
 Daniel Smith — strings (track 7)
 Jane Tameno — backing vocals (track 8)
 Mary Tameno — backing vocals (track 8)
 Grace Thande — backing vocals (track 8)
 Chris Thiongo — backing vocals (track 8)
 Keith Washington — backing vocals (track 2)
 Nathan Watts — bass (track 3), percussion (6), backing vocal arrangements (8)
 Fred White — backing vocals (track 8)
 Arthur Williams III — backing vocals (track 8)
 Phillip Williams — backing vocals (tracks 1, 2)
 Herschel Wise — strings (track 7)
 Steve Wise — backing vocals (tracks 1, 2)
 Syreeta Wright — backing vocals (track 9)

Production
 Stevie Wonder — producer and arranger
 Steve VanArden — engineer and mixing
 Jim Shelton — mastering
 Vaughn Halyard — associate producer, computer sound design
 Nathan Watts — co-associate producer
 Keith John — production assistant
 Malcolm Cecil — additional engineering and additional programming

Charts

Weekly charts

Year-end charts

Certifications

See also
List of number-one R&B albums of 1991 (U.S.)

References

External links
 

Drama film soundtracks
1991 soundtrack albums
Stevie Wonder soundtracks
Motown soundtracks
Albums produced by Stevie Wonder